The 2017 Tajik Supercup was the 8th Tajik Supercup, an annual Tajik football match played between the winners of the previous season's Tajik League and Tajik Cup. The match was contested by 2016 Tajik League and 2016 Tajik Cup champions, Istiklol, and the 2016 Tajik Cup Runners-up, Khosilot Farkhor. It was held at Central Stadium in Hisor a day before the first game of the 2017 Tajik League. Khosilot Farkhor won the match 2–1 with goals in the first half from Khairullo Azizov and Agbley Jones, with Istiklol striker Dmitry Barkov scoring a late consolation goal.

Background
Istiklol qualified as League and Cup champions, suffering only one defeat domestically all season, earning them a fourth straight Tajik Supercup appearance, and seventh in total.

Khosilot Farkhor qualified as runners-up to Istiklol in both the League and the cup, for their first appearance in the Supercup.

Match details

See also
2016 Tajik League
2016 Tajik Cup

References

Super Cup
Tajik Supercup